Borovoye is a rural locality (a selo) and the administrative center of Borovskoy Selsoviet, Krutikhinsky District, Altai Krai, Russia. The population was 388 as of 2013. There are 6 streets.

Geography 
Borovoye is located 10 km north of Krutikha (the district's administrative centre) by road. Maslyakha is the nearest rural locality.

References 

Rural localities in Krutikhinsky District